Amirhossein Sahebkar is an Iranian biotechnologist and Associate Professor of Pharmaceutical Biotechnology at Mashhad University of Medical Sciences and Honorary Research Fellow at UWA Medical School.
He is one of the top highly-cited researchers (h>100) according to webometrics.

References 

Living people
Year of birth missing (living people)
Iranian biotechnologists
Academic staff of Mashhad University of Medical Sciences
Mashhad University of Medical Sciences alumni
Iranian pharmacologists